The 1978–79 Segunda División was the 30th season of the Mexican Segunda División. The season started on 8 July 1978 and concluded on 22 June 1979. It was won by Atlas.

Changes 
 Zacatepec was promoted to Primera División.
 Atlas was relegated from Primera División.
 Zamora and U.V. Coatzacoalcos were promoted from Tercera División.
 Ciudad Victoria was relegated from Segunda División.
 Estudiantes de Querétaro and Querétaro F.C. were bought by the same businessman, after this, the new owner created two new teams called Atletas Campesinos and Atletas Industriales.
 Tecnológico de Celaya, Bravos de Ciudad Madero and Inter Acapulco have dissolved.

Teams

Group stage

Group 1

Group 2

Group 3

Group 4

Results

Final stage

Group 1

Group 2

Final

References 

1978–79 in Mexican football
Segunda División de México seasons